Yavor Peshleevski (born 29 June 1996) is a Bulgarian modern pentathlete.

He participated at the 2018 World Modern Pentathlon Championships, winning a medal.

References

External links

Living people
1996 births
Bulgarian male modern pentathletes
World Modern Pentathlon Championships medalists
Modern pentathletes at the 2014 Summer Youth Olympics